Scott Robert Sehon (born 1963) is an American philosopher and the Joseph E. Merrill Professor of philosophy at Bowdoin College. His primary work is in the fields of philosophy of mind, metaphysics, epistemology, philosophy of action, and the free will debate. He is the author of Teleological Realism: Mind, Agency and Explanation (MIT University Press, 2005) in which he takes a controversial, non-causalist view of action explanation as well as Free Will and Action Explanation: a Non-Causal, Compatibilist Account (Oxford University Press, 2016). Sehon has also published in the area of philosophy of religion, with a particular focus on the problem of evil and whether or not religious faith is a necessary foundation for morality. In his later work, he has criticized "anti anti-communism" and American conservative arguments against socialism.

Sehon received his B.A. in philosophy from Harvard University, where he worked with Warren D. Goldfarb, and earned a Ph.D. in philosophy at Princeton University, where he worked with Mark Johnston and Harry Frankfurt.  His thesis was titled: "Action Explanation and the Nature of Mental States."

Bibliography
Books
Free Will and Action Explanation: a Non-Causal, Compatibilist Account (Oxford University Press, 2016)
Teleological Realism: Mind, Agency and Explanation.  (MIT University Press, 2005)

Articles
“Davidson’s Challenge to the Non-Causalist”, with Guido Löhrer, American Philosophical Quarterly Vol. 53, no. 1 (2016): 85-96.
Action Explanation and The Free Will Debate: How Incompatibilist Arguments Go Wrong, Philosophical Issues, Vol.22, No. 1 (2012): 351-368.
A Flawed Conception of Determinism in the Consequence Argument. Analysis Vol. 71, No. 1 (2011):30-38.
Teleology and Degrees of Freedom, Internationale Zeitschrift für Philosophie, Volume 17:1 (2008): 123-144
An Argument Against the Causal Theory of Action Explanation, Philosophy and Phenomenological Research, 60:1(2000): 67-85
Connectionism and the Causal Theory of Action Explanation, Philosophical Psychology, 11:4(1998): 511-531
Natural-Kind Terms and the Status of Folk Psychology, American Philosophical Quarterly, 34:3(1997): 333-344
Deviant Causal Chains and the Irreducibility of Teleological Explanation, Pacific Philosophical Quarterly 78:2 (1997): 195-213
Teleology and the Nature of Mental States, American Philosophical Quarterly, 31 (1994): 63-72
Dementors, Horcruxes, and Immortality: The Soul in Harry Potter,” in Harry Potter and Philosophy: Hogwarts for Muggles, William Irwin and Gregory Bassham, eds.  Wiley (2010).
 “Teleological Explanation,” in Blackwell Companion to Philosophy of Action, Timothy O’Connor and Constantine Sandis, eds.  Blackwell. (2010).

References

External links
Scott Sehon's faculty web page
Works by Scott Sehon at Philpapers.org
Review of Teleological Realism in Notre Dame Philosophical Reviews
Review of Teleological Realism in Metapsychology Online Book Reviews
Megan Day and Micah Uetricht, "What Democratic Socialists Should Think About Anti-Communism." Jacobin Magazine, September 27, 2020.
Audio Interview with Scott Sehon on Common Sense Atheism.com
What Does it Mean to be Good? Two Scholars, Christian and Secular, Share Their Views, The Veritas Forum

20th-century American philosophers
Action theorists
Analytic philosophers
1963 births
Living people
Princeton University alumni
Harvard University alumni
Bowdoin College faculty